The 2004 OFC Nations Cup was an international football tournament that was held in Adelaide, Australia from 29 May to 6 June 2004 (with a two-legged final taking place on 9 and 12 October 2004). The 6 national teams involved in the tournament were required to register a squad of players; only players in these squads were eligible to take part in the tournament.  An initial four-team qualifying phase took place in Samoa and the Solomon Islands from 10 to 19 May 2004 allowing the top four, Fiji, Solomon Islands, Tahiti and Vanuatu, to move on and join Australia and New Zealand at the main tournament.

Players marked (c) were named as captain for their national squad. Players' club teams and players' age are as of 29 May 2004 – the tournament's opening day.

Squad lists

Australia
Coach: Frank Farina

Fiji
Coach:  Tony Buesnel

New Zealand
Coach:  Mick Waitt

Solomon Islands
Coach:  Alan Gillett

Tahiti
Coach: Gérard Kautai

Vanuatu
Coach:  Juan Carlos Buzzetti

Player representation

By club nationality 

Nations in italics are not represented by their national teams in the finals.

By representatives of domestic league

References

squads
OFC Nations Cup squads